Homophyllia is a genus of stony corals in the family Lobophylliidae.

Species
The World Register of Marine Species currently lists the following species:
 Homophyllia australis (Milne Edwards & Haime, 1848)
 Homophyllia bowerbanki (Milne Edwards, 1857)

References

Lobophylliidae
Scleractinia genera